Promurex is a subgenus of predatory sea snail, a marine gastropod mollusk in the family Muricidae, the rock snails or murex snails.

Extant and extinct species
Species within this subgenus include:
 Murex antelmei  Viader, 1938 
 Murex protocrassus  Houart, 1990 
 Murex spinicosta  Bronn 1831 † (extinct) 

Murex spinicosta lived in the Pliocene of Spain and Italy and in the Miocene of Denmark and Germany, from 11.608 to 2.588 Ma.

References

Muricinae
Gastropod subgenera